Pandering is the act of expressing one's views in accordance with the likes of a group to which one is attempting to appeal. The term is most notably associated with politics. In pandering, the views one is expressing are merely for the purpose of drawing support up to and including votes and do not necessarily reflect one's personal values.

See also
Flip-flop (politics)
Demagogue
Bunkum (from Wiktionary)

Political terminology

References